Aggregatibacter segnis is a species of bacteria. A. segnis can be cultured on chocolate agar.

References

Further reading 

 

Pasteurellales
Bacteria described in 1976